The Bold Three is a 1972 Hong Kong martial arts film produced by and directed by Fu Ching-hua and starring Chan Hung-lit, Yik Yuen, Miao Tien as titular trio protagonists.

Cast
Chan Hung-lit as Leung Tse-john (Dragon)
Yik Yuen as Chiao Tien-hou (Leopard)
Miao Tien as Boss Tiger Shih Hou
Doris Lung as Sung Sung
Wong Jun as Uncle Chen Chie-hao
Lu Bi-yun as Mama Leung
Mei Fang-yu as Japanese samurai
Chen Chien-ping as Master Leung
Su Chin-lung
Yueh Feng as Shih's thug
Wong Chau-hung as Shih's thug
Chiang Tao as Shih's thug
Ma Cheung as Shih's thug
Lee Hae-ryong as Chang Lieh

Crew
Action Director: Yen Yu-lung
Production Manager: Lee Po-tong
Executive Director: Cheng Yi-nan

Production
The Bold Three was filmed on location in Taiwan.

References

External links
The Bold Three at Hong Kong Cinemagic

1972 films
1972 action films
1972 martial arts films
Hong Kong action films
Hong Kong martial arts films
Kung fu films
1970s Mandarin-language films
Films shot in Taiwan
1970s Hong Kong films